The Anthem is the debut studio album from Swedish singer and former Idol contestant Darin. Reeleased by  RCA Records and BMG on 16 February 2005 in Sweden. It was his first commercial release following the independent release of his previous album Darin Zanyar in 2002. The Anthem features two top 10 singles, including the number one single "Money For Nothing". Also included on the album is the song "Coming True", which was recorded by Darin to be released as a single should he have won the Idol contest, but as he finished in second place, the song was included as a bonus track.

Background
After having finished in second place on Idol in 2004, Darin started recording his first studio album, working with producers such as RedOne, Ghost and Jörgen Elofsson. The album consists of 12 tracks: 10 new tracks, 1 bonus track and 1 reproduced tracks from Darin's debut independent album Darin Zanyar. The track "What You're Made of" was recorded as a demo for Darin's previous studio album and written by Darin himself, it was known as "What Ya Made of." The bonus track on the album, "Coming True," a song written and produced by Jörgen Elofsson, was recorded by Darin and fellow Idol contestant Daniel Lindström and would serve as the single for the eventual winner. Since Lindström won the contest, Darin's version was added as a bonus track.

Track listing 
Credits adapted from Spotify.

Charts

Weekly charts

Year-end charts

Certifications

Release history

References

2005 albums
Darin (singer) albums
Albums produced by Ghost (production team)
Albums produced by RedOne